Oxacme is a genus of moths in the subfamily Arctiinae. The genus was erected by George Hampson in 1894.

Species
 Oxacme asymmetrica Holloway, 2001
 Oxacme calcarea Holloway, 2001
 Oxacme commota (van Eecke, 1927)
 Oxacme commotoides Holloway, 2001
 Oxacme cretacea (Hampson, 1914)
 Oxacme dissimilis Hampson, 1894
 Oxacme marginata Hampson, 1896
 Oxacme umbrodorsum Holloway, 2001

References

Cisthenina
Moth genera